Bosmina freyi is a species of anomopod in the family Bosminidae.

References

Further reading

 
 

Cladocera
Articles created by Qbugbot
Crustaceans described in 1994